Opius is a genus of wasps in the family Braconidae. This genus has a wide geographic range and contains the majority of species in the subfamily Opiinae.

Species
 Opius abbyae
 Opius abditiformis
 Opius abditus
 Opius aberrans
 Opius aberranticeps
 Opius aberrantipennis
 Opius acarinatus
 Opius acharaviensis
 Opius acuminatus
 Opius acuticlypealis
 Opius acuticrenis
 Opius adanacola
 Opius adductus
 Opius adentatus
 Opius adversus
 Opius aethiops
 Opius affinis
 Opius africanus
 Opius agromyzicola
 Opius ajax
 Opius alachuanus
 Opius albericus
 Opius albiapex
 Opius aldrichi
 Opius alekhinoensis
 Opius almatus
 Opius alsenus
 Opius altaiensis
 Opius alteratus
 Opius alticlypeatus
 Opius altritemporalis
 Opius alutaceator
 Opius alutacipectus
 Opius alvarengai
 Opius amaichaensis
 Opius amarellae
 Opius ambiguus
 Opius ambirius
 Opius ambitus
 Opius americanus
 Opius amplus
 Opius amurensis
 Opius anastrephae
 Opius andigeni
 Opius anduzei
 Opius angelus
 Opius angustatus
 Opius angusticellularis
 Opius angustistriatus
 Opius angustisulcus
 Opius ankaratrensis
 Opius annellaticornis
 Opius antefurcalis
 Opius antennatus
 Opius anthriscoidis
 Opius antrimensis
 Opius apfelbeckianus
 Opius apicalis
 Opius araucoensis
 Opius areatus
 Opius arenaceus
 Opius areolatus
 Opius argillaceus
 Opius aridis
 Opius arundinis
 Opius ascazubianus
 Opius atatanaensis
 Opius atricornis
 Opius atrocoxalis
 Opius attila
 Opius attributus
 Opius aureliae
 Opius austriacus
 Opius avispasensis
 Opius baguioensis
 Opius bajariae
 Opius bakonyensis
 Opius baldufi
 Opius ballade
 Opius balthasarius
 Opius bananipes
 Opius barraudi
 Opius barrioni
 Opius barrosensis
 Opius basalis
 Opius basicastaneus
 Opius basiniger
 Opius basirufulus
 Opius basisimplex
 Opius beieri
 Opius bellus
 Opius betae
 Opius bicarinifer
 Opius bicoloriformis
 Opius bidentis
 Opius bifossatus
 Opius blancasi
 Opius blantoni
 Opius boharti
 Opius bonatus
 Opius borneanus
 Opius bouceki
 Opius brachythorax
 Opius brasiliensis
 Opius brevicaudatus
 Opius brevicaudis
 Opius bromensis
 Opius brooki
 Opius brownsvillensis
 Opius bruneipes
 Opius brunescens
 Opius brunipennis
 Opius brunneitarsis
 Opius brunneiventris
 Opius brunnicoxis
 Opius bucki
 Opius buenaventurae
 Opius bulgaricus
 Opius bullatianus
 Opius bururianus
 Opius busuensis
 Opius caboverdensis
 Opius caesus
 Opius calatheae
 Opius callaensis
 Opius camerunensis
 Opius campinaensis
 Opius candixtus
 Opius canimensis
 Opius canlaonicus
 Opius cannonbeachensis
 Opius capeki
 Opius caprifolii
 Opius caprilesi
 Opius caracasensis
 Opius cardini
 Opius carensis
 Opius caricivorae
 Opius carinifacialis
 Opius carinifer
 Opius carinus
 Opius casparianus
 Opius castaneigaster
 Opius castor
 Opius caucasi
 Opius caudatus
 Opius caudisignatus
 Opius cehalovicki
 Opius celsiformis
 Opius celsus
 Opius chapini
 Opius chapmani
 Opius chewaucanus
 Opius chilensis
 Opius chillcotti
 Opius chimus
 Opius choristigma
 Opius chromaticus
 Opius chromatomyiae
 Opius chrysostigmus
 Opius ciceris
 Opius ciliatus
 Opius cinctus
 Opius cinerariae
 Opius cingulaticornis
 Opius cingulatigaster
 Opius cingulatoides
 Opius cingulatus
 Opius cingutolicus
 Opius cinnameus
 Opius circinus
 Opius circulator
 Opius circumscriptus
 Opius cisopertus
 Opius citlus
 Opius citripes
 Opius citronipus
 Opius clausus
 Opius clellanvillensis
 Opius clevelandensis
 Opius clidogastrae
 Opius cocafluvianus
 Opius cochisensis
 Opius coleogaster
 Opius colombina
 Opius coloradensis
 Opius coloraticeps
 Opius columbiacus
 Opius columbicus
 Opius commodus
 Opius compar
 Opius comparativus
 Opius conasis
 Opius concepcionensis
 Opius confundens
 Opius confusus
 Opius congoensis
 Opius connivens
 Opius contabundus
 Opius contractor
 Opius contrahens
 Opius contrasticeps
 Opius contrasticus
 Opius contrax
 Opius contrut
 Opius convergitalis
 Opius copaxis
 Opius cordobensis
 Opius corfuensis
 Opius coriaceus
 Opius coriaciceps
 Opius cortesanus
 Opius cosa
 Opius costaeburneae
 Opius costaricensis
 Opius crandalli
 Opius crassiceps
 Opius crassicrus
 Opius crassipes
 Opius crenulaticeps
 Opius crenulatus
 Opius crenuturis
 Opius crescentensis
 Opius cuencaensis
 Opius culatus
 Opius cumbaratzaensis
 Opius curiosicornis
 Opius curritibensis
 Opius curtiarticulatus
 Opius curticaudatus
 Opius curticornis
 Opius curticubitalis
 Opius curtisignum
 Opius curtisternaulis
 Opius curtitarsus
 Opius curvatus
 Opius cuzcoensis
 Opius cynipsidum
 Opius cyphus
 Opius cyrilli
 Opius daghestanicus
 Opius daghoides
 Opius dakarensis
 Opius damnosus
 Opius danicus
 Opius danielssoni
 Opius dariae
 Opius dataensis
 Opius deiphobe
 Opius delhianus
 Opius deliciosus
 Opius delipunctis
 Opius delvillei
 Opius demosthenis
 Opius derus
 Opius dewulfi
 Opius diana
 Opius diastatae
 Opius dicolatus
 Opius differentiarius
 Opius difficillimus
 Opius dilucidus
 Opius dimensus
 Opius dimidiatus
 Opius discordiosus
 Opius discreparius
 Opius disparens
 Opius dissitus
 Opius distincticornis
 Opius distortus
 Opius diurnus
 Opius divergens
 Opius divergifacialis
 Opius diversicurrens
 Opius dividus
 Opius dizygomyzae
 Opius docilis
 Opius dolichurus
 Opius dominicanus
 Opius douglasanus
 Opius downesi
 Opius dreisbachi
 Opius dryade
 Opius dschangensis
 Opius dubitarius
 Opius duplocarinatus
 Opius dureseaui
 Opius durigaster
 Opius eastridgeanus
 Opius echingolensis
 Opius echo
 Opius efoveolatus
 Opius egenus
 Opius ehrhorni
 Opius elguetai
 Opius elisabethvillensis
 Opius elsalvadorensis
 Opius eltablonensis
 Opius emarginatus
 Opius empedoklis
 Opius entzi
 Opius epimeralis
 Opius epulatiformis
 Opius epulatus
 Opius eros
 Opius erythroicus
 Opius erythrosoma
 Opius erzurumensis
 Opius esquinasensis
 Opius estoniacola
 Opius euaffinis
 Opius eupatorii
 Opius euphemia
 Opius euplasticus
 Opius euryanthe
 Opius euryteniformis
 Opius eurytenoides
 Opius euterpe
 Opius eutownesi
 Opius euwattacooanus
 Opius exiloides
 Opius eximius
 Opius extendicella
 Opius extensus
 Opius extrafactus
 Opius extremorientis
 Opius faber
 Opius facialis
 Opius farmingdalicus
 Opius femoralis
 Opius fennahi
 Opius fercolor
 Opius ferentarius
 Opius ferrugator
 Opius ficedus
 Opius fiebrigi
 Opius filicornis
 Opius filiflagellatus
 Opius finalis
 Opius fischeri
 Opius flammeus
 Opius flavens
 Opius flaveolaris
 Opius flaviceps
 Opius flavigaster
 Opius flavipartibus
 Opius flavipes
 Opius flavitestaceus
 Opius flavobasis
 Opius flosshilda
 Opius formosanus
 Opius formosigaster
 Opius forticornis
 Opius fossulatus
 Opius foutsi
 Opius fraudatus
 Opius fraudulentus
 Opius fulgoricolor
 Opius fumatipennis
 Opius furiosus
 Opius fuscicarpus
 Opius fuscipennis
 Opius gabrieli
 Opius gainesvillensis
 Opius galomirus
 Opius geniculatus
 Opius gerdi
 Opius giganticornis
 Opius gigapiceus
 Opius giluweensis
 Opius glabriceps
 Opius glabrifossa
 Opius glabripleurum
 Opius gliricidiae
 Opius globiformis
 Opius globigaster
 Opius gracielae
 Opius gracilior
 Opius gracilis
 Opius graecus
 Opius granipleuris
 Opius granulatigaster
 Opius graviceps
 Opius grenadensis
 Opius gribodoi
 Opius griffithsi
 Opius griseinotum
 Opius griseiscutum
 Opius guanabarensis
 Opius guatemalensis
 Opius gyges
 Opius gyoerfii
 Opius haereticus
 Opius haeselbarthi
 Opius halconicus
 Opius hancockanus
 Opius hardmanni
 Opius harlequin
 Opius harmonicus
 Opius harteni
 Opius hartleyi
 Opius hauca
 Opius hector
 Opius hedqvisti
 Opius heinrichi
 Opius helavai
 Opius helios
 Opius hellasensis
 Opius helluatus
 Opius hemifuscus
 Opius herbigradus
 Opius heringi
 Opius hermosanus
 Opius heroicus
 Opius heterocephalus
 Opius heterochromus
 Opius heterogaster
 Opius heteropterus
 Opius hirsutus
 Opius hirtus
 Opius hluluhwegamenicus
 Opius hoffmanni
 Opius hollisterensis
 Opius horwathi
 Opius hospes
 Opius hospitus
 Opius hubbelli
 Opius humilifactus
 Opius hydrellivorus
 Opius idealis
 Opius ignatii
 Opius igneus
 Opius iguacuensis
 Opius ileifensis
 Opius imperator
 Opius importatus
 Opius importunus
 Opius impressiformis
 Opius inancae
 Opius inca
 Opius incisulus
 Opius incoligma
 Opius indentatus
 Opius indistinctus
 Opius inflammatus
 Opius inflatipectus
 Opius infumatus
 Opius infuscatipennis
 Opius ingenticornis
 Opius inopinatus
 Opius inquirendus
 Opius instabilis
 Opius instabiloides
 Opius instaurativus
 Opius insulicola
 Opius integer
 Opius interjectus
 Opius intermissus
 Opius interpunctatus
 Opius interstitialis
 Opius iphigenia
 Opius iridipennis
 Opius irregularipes
 Opius irregularis
 Opius isolatae
 Opius ispartaensis
 Opius ithacensis
 Opius iuxtahaucaum
 Opius iuxtangelum
 Opius ivlievi
 Opius ivondroensis
 Opius izmirensis
 Opius jacansis
 Opius jacobi
 Opius jamaicensis
 Opius jenuffa
 Opius jipanus
 Opius johannis
 Opius josefi
 Opius jujuyensis
 Opius kaindeanus
 Opius kallibasis
 Opius kalligaster
 Opius karesuandensis
 Opius katonensis
 Opius katonicus
 Opius keralaicus
 Opius kibunguensis
 Opius kilisanus
 Opius kinleyensis
 Opius kirklareliensis
 Opius kisanganiensis
 Opius kostolnaensis
 Opius kovacsi
 Opius krishnagarensis
 Opius krombeini
 Opius kubani
 Opius kurilensis
 Opius kuruandensis
 Opius kuscheli
 Opius kyotoensis
 Opius labradorensis
 Opius lacajensis
 Opius lacarensis
 Opius lacopitaensis
 Opius laetatorius
 Opius laevicollis
 Opius laevigatus
 Opius lagomeraensis
 Opius languidus
 Opius lansingensis
 Opius lantanae
 Opius lara
 Opius larissa
 Opius lataganus
 Opius lateroareatus
 Opius latidens
 Opius latifacialis
 Opius latipediformis
 Opius latistigma
 Opius latitemporalis
 Opius leevingensis
 Opius leleji
 Opius lemonensis
 Opius leptoclypeus
 Opius leptosoma
 Opius leroyi
 Opius leucofasciatus
 Opius leucosema
 Opius leucoventris
 Opius levis
 Opius liogaster
 Opius lippensi
 Opius lippensimilis
 Opius liriomyzae
 Opius lissopleurum
 Opius lojaensis
 Opius longicornis
 Opius longicubitalis
 Opius longifoveatus
 Opius longiradis
 Opius longisignum
 Opius longissimicauda
 Opius longistigmus
 Opius lonicerae
 Opius loricatus
 Opius lucidoides
 Opius lucidus
 Opius lugens
 Opius lukasi
 Opius luniclypeus
 Opius lusorius
 Opius luteiceps
 Opius luteipes
 Opius luteus
 Opius macedonicus
 Opius machupicchuanus
 Opius macrocornis
 Opius maculimembris
 Opius maculipennis
 Opius maculipes
 Opius madatus
 Opius magallanensis
 Opius magicorum
 Opius magnicauda
 Opius magnicaudatus
 Opius major
 Opius mallecoensis
 Opius mandibularis
 Opius manifestarius
 Opius maraquoanus
 Opius marcapatanus
 Opius marci
 Opius margaensis
 Opius margateensis
 Opius mariae
 Opius marjorieae
 Opius martiarushensis
 Opius martini
 Opius matheranus
 Opius matthaei
 Opius mediopectus
 Opius mediosignum
 Opius medioterebratus
 Opius megafossa
 Opius meladermatus
 Opius melanagromyzae
 Opius melanarius
 Opius melanocephalus
 Opius melchioricus
 Opius mendus
 Opius metanivens
 Opius metanotalis
 Opius metatensis
 Opius metatus
 Opius methodii
 Opius michaeli
 Opius michelbacheri
 Opius microscopicus
 Opius microsomaticus
 Opius middlekauffi
 Opius miniaceus
 Opius minicornis
 Opius minorecella
 Opius minusculae
 Opius minusculus
 Opius minutus
 Opius mirabilis
 Opius mischa
 Opius mischiformis
 Opius mitiformis
 Opius mitis
 Opius mocsaryi
 Opius moczari
 Opius moderatus
 Opius mokotoensis
 Opius mongaguanus
 Opius mongolaltaiensis
 Opius monilicornis
 Opius monsonicus
 Opius montanus
 Opius montevidanus
 Opius monticola
 Opius moravicus
 Opius mujenjensis
 Opius mundus
 Opius myakkensis
 Opius nadezhdae
 Opius nadus
 Opius najade
 Opius nanocorpus
 Opius nanosoma
 Opius nanulus
 Opius nanus
 Opius negrosanus
 Opius neopendulus
 Opius neopygmaeus
 Opius nigeriensis
 Opius nigricolor
 Opius nigricoloratus
 Opius nigriocciput
 Opius nigritellae
 Opius nigritibia
 Opius nigrobrunneus
 Opius nigrocastaneus
 Opius nigromaculatus
 Opius nigrusus
 Opius nimifactus
 Opius niobe
 Opius nitidulator
 Opius nitidus
 Opius nivitibialis
 Opius nkuliensis
 Opius nobilis
 Opius nodifer
 Opius nomininguensis
 Opius nondilatatus
 Opius noonadanus
 Opius nories
 Opius northcarolinensis
 Opius nosamaensis
 Opius nowakowskii
 Opius novojariae
 Opius novosimilis
 Opius nympha
 Opius obesus
 Opius obscurator
 Opius obscurifactus
 Opius obscurifemur
 Opius obscuripennis
 Opius obscuripes
 Opius obscuroma
 Opius obuduensis
 Opius obustus
 Opius obversus
 Opius occidentalis
 Opius occulisus
 Opius ocellatus
 Opius ochrogaster
 Opius ocreatus
 Opius olmosensis
 Opius onzi
 Opius opacus
 Opius opertaneus
 Opius opertus
 Opius opportunus
 Opius oralis
 Opius orbiculator
 Opius ordinarius
 Opius orestes
 Opius orizabensis
 Opius ornatigaster
 Opius oscinidis
 Opius osogovoensis
 Opius osoguineus
 Opius ostentaneus
 Opius ostentatus
 Opius otiosus
 Opius ovaliscapus
 Opius ovator
 Opius ovistigma
 Opius oxatus
 Opius pachypus
 Opius pactus
 Opius padidalis
 Opius pallas
 Opius pallicoxis
 Opius pallidipalpalis
 Opius palligaster
 Opius pallipes
 Opius palpalis
 Opius panamanus
 Opius pandora
 Opius papagena
 Opius paradisiacus
 Opius paraensis
 Opius paraitepuyensis
 Opius paralleliformis
 Opius parallelipetiolatus
 Opius paranivens
 Opius paraphytomyzae
 Opius paraplasticus
 Opius paraqvisti
 Opius parawattacooanus
 Opius paris
 Opius parkeranus
 Opius parkercreekensis
 Opius partisanskiensis
 Opius parvicrenis
 Opius parvungula
 Opius paulior
 Opius paulus
 Opius pauper
 Opius pechlaneri
 Opius pechumani
 Opius peckorum
 Opius pedestris
 Opius peleus
 Opius penai
 Opius pendulus
 Opius penetrator
 Opius pequodorum
 Opius perminutus
 Opius perpygmaeus
 Opius persimilis
 Opius perterrens
 Opius peruensis
 Opius pestarus
 Opius peterseni
 Opius petiolaris
 Opius petiolatus
 Opius petri
 Opius phantasticus
 Opius phytobiae
 Opius pickensanus
 Opius pilgrimorum
 Opius pilifer
 Opius piloralis
 Opius pilosicornis
 Opius pilosinotum
 Opius pilosus
 Opius pimoensis
 Opius pirchitticola
 Opius pisgahensis
 Opius plaumanni
 Opius podomelas
 Opius pollux
 Opius polyzonius
 Opius ponticus
 Opius porrectus
 Opius porteri
 Opius posadai
 Opius posjeticus
 Opius praesentarius
 Opius prignum
 Opius primus
 Opius prolongatus
 Opius propeattilam
 Opius propectoralis
 Opius propecubitalis
 Opius propepactum
 Opius propodealis
 Opius propofoveatus
 Opius propriorufus
 Opius protractiterebra
 Opius pseudarenaceus
 Opius pseudocolumbiacus
 Opius pseudonapomyzae
 Opius pseudoromensis
 Opius pterostigmalis
 Opius pterostigmatus
 Opius pterus
 Opius puertoplatanus
 Opius pulchriceps
 Opius pulex
 Opius pulicariae
 Opius pumilio
 Opius punanus
 Opius punctaticlypeus
 Opius puncticeps
 Opius punctipes
 Opius punctularius
 Opius punctulatoides
 Opius punctulatus
 Opius pusillator
 Opius pusillus
 Opius putomayoanus
 Opius pygmaeator
 Opius pygmaeus
 Opius pyrogaster
 Opius quadricolor
 Opius quasilatipes
 Opius quasipulvis
 Opius quasiqvisti
 Opius quercicola
 Opius radialis
 Opius rainierensis
 Opius ranunculicola
 Opius raoi
 Opius rarus
 Opius reconditor
 Opius rectinervatus
 Opius regularipes
 Opius regulorum
 Opius relativus
 Opius remissus
 Opius remotus
 Opius repentinus
 Opius resinae
 Opius restrictus
 Opius resupinus
 Opius retracticauda
 Opius rex
 Opius rheasilviae
 Opius rhodopicola
 Opius rhodosoma
 Opius richardsi
 Opius riopastazanus
 Opius riphaeus
 Opius robustus
 Opius romensis
 Opius romensoides
 Opius rossi
 Opius rotundiusculus
 Opius roveretoi
 Opius rovinator
 Opius rudiformis
 Opius rufescens
 Opius ruficolor
 Opius rufimixtus
 Opius rufipes
 Opius rufipleurum
 Opius rufisignum
 Opius rufocinctus
 Opius rufomaculatus
 Opius rufopleuris
 Opius rufus
 Opius rugatus
 Opius rugicoxis
 Opius rugipropodealis
 Opius rugisternum
 Opius rugosiusculus
 Opius rugosulus
 Opius rumecatus
 Opius russalka
 Opius sabhayanus
 Opius sabroskyi
 Opius saevulus
 Opius saevus
 Opius salmonensis
 Opius salmossi
 Opius saltator
 Opius salvini
 Opius sanctannae
 Opius sanctus
 Opius sanestabanensis
 Opius sanjoseensis
 Opius sanmiguelensis
 Opius santosanus
 Opius santuzzae
 Opius saovicentensis
 Opius sapamoroanus
 Opius sapporanus
 Opius scaevolae
 Opius schildi
 Opius schmidti
 Opius scleroticus
 Opius sculptigaster
 Opius sculptipleurum
 Opius sculptisaevus
 Opius scutellocarina
 Opius seductus
 Opius selimbassai
 Opius seminotaulicus
 Opius semitestaceus
 Opius servus
 Opius shabelliensis
 Opius sharynensis
 Opius shenefelti
 Opius shuleri
 Opius sierraanchaensis
 Opius sigmodus
 Opius signatitibia
 Opius signicella
 Opius signicoxa
 Opius signifemur
 Opius signipes
 Opius signisoma
 Opius silifkeensis
 Opius silvestris
 Opius similarius
 Opius similis
 Opius simillimus
 Opius similoides
 Opius simplex
 Opius simplificatus
 Opius sinareola
 Opius sinenotaulis
 Opius singularis
 Opius singulator
 Opius sinocis
 Opius smithi
 Opius snoflaki
 Opius soenderupianus
 Opius soledadensis
 Opius solus
 Opius solymosae
 Opius sonja
 Opius soror
 Opius southcarolinensis
 Opius speciosus
 Opius sperabilis
 Opius srilankensis
 Opius staryi
 Opius stenopectus
 Opius stieglmayri
 Opius striatitergum
 Opius striativentris
 Opius striatoides
 Opius striatulus
 Opius strombaceus
 Opius strouhali
 Opius subaffinis
 Opius subareatus
 Opius subcampanariae
 Opius subcirculator
 Opius subdividus
 Opius subdocilis
 Opius subhilaris
 Opius subpallipes
 Opius subpulicariae
 Opius subreconditor
 Opius subrotundatus
 Opius subsimilis
 Opius subversivus
 Opius subvisibilis
 Opius subvitellinus
 Opius succineus
 Opius sulcifer
 Opius superbus
 Opius superficiarius
 Opius suscitatus
 Opius suspiciosus
 Opius sybille
 Opius sycophanta
 Opius tabificus
 Opius tablerockensis
 Opius taddei
 Opius tadzhicus
 Opius tafivallensis
 Opius takomaanus
 Opius tamara
 Opius tametus
 Opius tamino
 Opius tangens
 Opius tantalus
 Opius tantilloides
 Opius tantillus
 Opius taplejungensis
 Opius teheranensis
 Opius tekirdagensis
 Opius telamonis
 Opius telramundi
 Opius tenellae
 Opius tenfanus
 Opius tenuipilosus
 Opius terebrator
 Opius terebratus
 Opius terebrifer
 Opius tergitalis
 Opius tersus
 Opius testaceipes
 Opius testaceiventris
 Opius testaceus
 Opius thaicorus
 Opius thalia
 Opius thalis
 Opius thaungi
 Opius thiemo
 Opius thoracicus
 Opius thoracoangulatus
 Opius tibialis
 Opius tingomarianus
 Opius tirolensis
 Opius tobiasi
 Opius tolucaensis
 Opius toromojaensis
 Opius tortus
 Opius torulatus
 Opius townesi
 Opius townsendi
 Opius trachyscutum
 Opius transatlanticus
 Opius transbaikalicus
 Opius transcaucasicus
 Opius transversoclypealis
 Opius trencensis
 Opius triplehorni
 Opius tristis
 Opius tropaeoli
 Opius troyensis
 Opius truncatulus
 Opius tscheki
 Opius tshitensis
 Opius tshutshurmuranicus
 Opius tuberculatus
 Opius tuberculifer
 Opius tubibasis
 Opius tucumanus
 Opius tulcanensis
 Opius tumus
 Opius tunensis
 Opius turcicus
 Opius turiddui
 Opius turrialbanus
 Opius uencensis
 Opius ugandensis
 Opius ulaanus
 Opius uligiloci
 Opius unicarinatus
 Opius unicatus
 Opius unifactus
 Opius unifasciatus
 Opius unificatus
 Opius uniformis
 Opius unitus
 Opius urundanus
 Opius utahensis
 Opius utinanus
 Opius uttoi
 Opius uttoisimilis
 Opius uvarovi
 Opius wachsmanni
 Opius valdiviensis
 Opius valki
 Opius walleyi
 Opius waterloti
 Opius wattacooanus
 Opius weemsi
 Opius wellgunda
 Opius veratri
 Opius vernicosus
 Opius vianus
 Opius vicinigundae
 Opius victosimilis
 Opius viennensis
 Opius vierecki
 Opius wilhelmensis
 Opius villavicenciensis
 Opius vindex
 Opius vinoanus
 Opius violaceae
 Opius virentis
 Opius virtuosus
 Opius visibilis
 Opius vitellinus
 Opius vittatus
 Opius vocatus
 Opius woerziphagus
 Opius woglinda
 Opius volaticus
 Opius vulcanicus
 Opius wutaishanus
 Opius xerxes
 Opius yahuarmayoanus
 Opius yuracensis
 Opius zacapuensis
 Opius zamoraensis

References

Braconidae genera